Panthoibi Khongul(literally, "in quest of Panthoibi" or "Panthoibi's footprint"), also spelt as Panthoipi Khongkul, is a medieval Meitei literary work (puya), narrating about the quest of goddess Panthoibi. The text highlights the love saga of Panthoibi and her ultimate lover Nongpok Ningthou, after leaving her husband's house. Many scholars believe the work to be written during the 12th century AD.

The text also talks about how the festival Lai Haraoba was begun after the union of the two lovers.

Editions 

 In 1963, the scripture "Panthoibi Khongkul" was published by M. Chandra Singh.
 In 1968, the scripture was again published by N. Ibobi Singh.

Bibliography 

 Ariba Manipuri Sahityagee Saklon

References 

Meitei culture
Pages with unreviewed translations
Puyas